Blaine School District No. 503 is a public school district in Whatcom County, Washington, USA, that serves the communities of Blaine and Point Roberts, the latter of which is separated from the rest of the United States by the Canada–United States border. In October 2004, the district had an enrollment of 2,272 students.

Schools

High schools
Blaine High School

Middle schools
Blaine Middle School

Primary schools
Blaine Elementary School
Blaine Primary School
Point Roberts Primary School

Other schools
Blaine Home Connection

Notable alumni
 Scott Gomez, a professional ice hockey player
 Luke Ridnour, a professional basketball player

References

External links
Blaine School District
Blaine School District Report Card

School districts in Washington (state)
Education in Whatcom County, Washington